A History of Pi (also titled A History of ) is a 1970 non-fiction book by Petr Beckmann that presents a layman's introduction to the concept of the mathematical constant pi.

Author
Beckmann was a Czechoslovakian who fled the Communist regime to go to the United States. His dislike of authority gives A History of Pi a style that belies its dry title. For example, his chapter on the era following the classical age of ancient Greece is titled "The Roman Pest"; he calls the Catholic Inquisition the act of "insane religious fanatic"; and he says that people who question public spending on scientific research are "intellectual cripples who drivel about 'too much technology' because technology has wounded them with the ultimate insult: 'They can't understand it any more.'"

Beckmann was a prolific scientific author who wrote several electrical engineering textbooks and non-technical works, founded Golem Press, which published most of his books, and published his own monthly newsletter, Access to Energy. In his self-published book Einstein Plus Two and in Internet flame wars, he claimed that the theory of relativity is incorrect.

Bibliography
This edition did not cover any approximations of  calculated after 1946. A third edition was published as A History of Pi in 1976 by St. Martin's Press. It was published as A History of Pi by Hippocrene Books in 1990. The title is given as A History of Pi by both Amazon and by WorldCat.

See also 
 History of Pi

References

1970 non-fiction books
Popular mathematics books
Pi